Grevillea × semperflorens is a grevillea cultivar originating from England. It grows up to about 2 metres in height and has yellow-green flowers.

The cultivar was first formally described in 1937 by F.E. Briggs in The Journal of the Royal Horticultural Society of London as Grevillea semperflorens.

See also
 List of Grevillea cultivars

References

Semperflorens
Cultivars of Australian plants
Proteales of Australia